Vladímir Admóni (October 29, 1909, St. Petersburg, Russia - 26 November 1993, St. Petersburg, Russia) was a 
Soviet linguist, literary critic, translator and poet, doctor of philological Sciences (1947), Professor (1948).  
Correspondent member of Göttingen Academy of Sciences and Humanities, doctor honoris causa at the University of Uppsala. 
President of the Bureau of the section of literary translation of the Leningrad (now St. Petersburg) branch of USSR (now Russian Federation). 
He wrote numerous works of the German language, the theory of grammar, essays about German and Scandinavian literature. Verses, prose memoir, poetic and prose translations from German and the Scandinavian languages to Russian (many co-authored with his wife, T. I. Silman).

Biography
Vladimir was a son of the famous historian, publicist and Jewish community leader Gregoriy Yakovlevich Krasniy-Admoni; and
the younger brother of the composer . He graduated from the Department of foreign languages at Leningrad State Pedagogical Institute (now Herzen University) (1930). PhD thesis (1939) has been devoted to the works of Jean Paul, doctoral dissertation (1947) - creativity of Henrik Ibsen. Since 1960 until the death he was a fellow of the Institute for Linguistic Studies, Russian Academy of Sciences.

In 1964, at the court session on the case of Joseph Brodsky he spoke in his defense, commending him as a poet and translator.

Since 1984, he published several collections of original poems (some are in German or translated into German by the author);
in co-authorship with T. I. Silman - prose memoir «We remember» (1993).

He was formed a linguist-Germanist by the Leningrad philology school.  He paid great attention to the facts of the history of language; 
he was the first who used the concept of the field structure in the grammatical analysis.

Main works

Linguistics
 Maintenance of the syntax of modern German language (. M (Moscow)., 1955.
 The historic German syntax (. M., 1963.
 Ways of development of grammatical system of the German language (. M., 1973.
 Fundamentals of the theory of grammar (., 1964.
 The grammatical structure as the build system and the General theory of grammar. M., 1988.
 The system forms of expression of speech (. SPb (Saint-Petersburg)., 1994.

Literary criticism
 Henrik Ibsen  Essay about creativity. 2-nd issue. L., 1989.
 Thomas Mann Essay about creativity. L., 1960. (coauthored with T. I. Silman).
 Poetics and reality: From observations over foreign literature in the XX century L., 1975.

References

 Павлов В. М., Шубик С. А. Владимир Григорьевич Адмони (1909—1993) // Известия РАН. СЛЯ, т. 53, No. 3, с. 94–95.
 On the website: Владимир Адмони
 Shulamit Shalit, Поэт и муза

1909 births
1993 deaths
Writers from Saint Petersburg
Russian Jews
Linguists from the Soviet Union
Soviet philologists
Soviet poets
Soviet literary critics
Uppsala University alumni
Soviet literary historians
Herzen University alumni
Members of the Göttingen Academy of Sciences and Humanities